Richard "Dick" Gordon (born November 6, 1943) is an American theoretical biologist. He was born in Brooklyn, New York, the eldest son of Jack Gordon, a salesman and American handball champion, and artist Diana Gordon. He is married to retired scientist Natalie K Björklund with whom he co-wrote his second book and several academic publications. He has three sons, Leland, Bryson and Chason Gordon and three stepchildren Justin, Alan and Lana Hunstad. Gordon was a professor at the University of Manitoba in Winnipeg, Manitoba from 1978 to 2011. He is retired and currently volunteers as a scientist for the Gulf Specimen Marine Laboratory in Panacea, Florida where he winters, and he holds an adjunct position in the Department of Obstetrics & Gynecology, Wayne State University. Gordon lives in Alonsa, Manitoba, Canada.

Academic career
Gordon was educated at University of Chicago where he did an undergraduate degree in Mathematics and a PhD at University of Oregon in Chemical Physics under Terrell L Hill. His thesis was On Stochastic Growth and Form and Steady State Properties of Ising Lattice Membranes. He published his first paper in 1966. Gordon is an eclectic scientist and prolific writer with over 200 peer-reviewed publications in a wide number of fields. He has edited 17 academic books and special issues of scientific journals including two books of his own both of which detail his work on embryonic differentiation waves. Gordon has been summoned twice to the Canadian Parliament to testify as an expert scientific witness. He is best known for interdisciplinary and cross disciplinary work bridging biology with fields such as mathematics, engineering, physics and chemistry. He wrote the first paper on diatom nanotechnology founding that field. He started the field of adaptive image processing. He has also published about algal biofuels, computed tomography, AIDS prevention, neural tube defects, embryo physics, astrobiology as well as research and social ethics. His most cited paper is one where he applied the linear Kaczmarz method to create the nonlinear Algebraic Reconstruction Technique for image reconstruction with Robert Bender and Gabor Herman in 1970.

Notable scientific publications

Books
 Gordon, N. & Gordon, R. Embryogenesis Explained, World Scientific Publishing, Singapore, 2016.
 Gordon, R. (1999). The Hierarchical Genome and Differentiation Waves: Novel Unification of Development, Genetics and Evolution. Singapore & London,  World Scientific & Imperial College Press.

Selected academic publications
 Gordon, R., R. Bender & G.T. Herman (1970). Algebraic Reconstruction Techniques (ART) for three-dimensional electron microscopy and x-ray photography. Journal of Theoretical Biology 29(3), 471-481.
 Gordon, R., G.T. Herman & S.A. Johnson (1975). Image reconstruction from projections. Scientific American 233(4), cover, 12, 56-61, 64-68, 139.
 Gordon, R. (1976). Dose reduction in computerized tomography. [Guest Editorial]. Investigative Radiology 111(6), 508-517.
 Gordon, R. & A.G. Jacobson (1978). The shaping of tissues in embryos. Scientific American 238(6), 106-113, 160.
 Gordon, R., N.K. Björklund & P.D. Nieuwkoop (1994). Dialogue on embryonic induction and differentiation waves. International Review of Cytology 150, 373-420.
 Gordon, R. & R.W. Drum (1994). The chemical basis of diatom morphogenesis. International Review of Cytology 150, 243-372, 421-422.

Other work
The Canadian charity Books With Wings was founded by Richard Gordon. He started the work after developing an intense interest in Afghanistan as his personal response to the September 11 attacks. Books With Wings is a collaborative project between Canadian, British, and American students and their counterparts in Afghanistan to provide books for universities throughout Afghanistan. Sally Armstrong described Gordon's early efforts to start Books With Wings in her book Ascent of Women.

References

1943 births
Living people
Scientists from Brooklyn
University of Chicago alumni
University of Oregon alumni
Academic staff of the University of Manitoba
Wayne State University faculty
21st-century American biologists
21st-century American physicists